99.7 Rhema FM (call sign: 2RFM) is the local Christian radio station for the Newcastle and Hunter Region in New South Wales, Australia. It is funded by a combination of members fees and sponsorship advertising and has some volunteer staffing. They are a registered not-for-profit organisation with charitable status.

Starting out on temporary broadcast on 11 May 1987, they were granted a permanent licence from 1 December 1999 beating a rival proposed radio station for the blind for the licence. Rhema FM Newcastle has now been established for over 30 years, and full-time broadcasting for over 15.

In 2015 Rhema FM went off air for some weeks as storms smashed through the region causing their transmitter on Mt Sugarloaf to fail.

Rhema FM Newcastle is a ‘home mission, with a mission to reach every home.’ They claim to aspire to reach those within the community and beyond, providing quality and 100% Christian music and content. Amongst its many on-air and community initiatives, Rhema FM also provides a free online listening service called rhemacatchup.com, accommodating for its global audience.

They also promote local artists on air, provide airtime for local community radio shows  and offer free resources to the community for finding work on Jobline  and promoting local events on the Community Noticeboard.

External links
http://www.rhemafm.com.au/

Christian radio stations in Australia
Community radio stations in Australia
Radio stations in Newcastle, New South Wales
Rhema FM Newcastle
1999 establishments in Australia